Muda is a genus of cicadas in the family Cicadidae. There are at least four described species in Muda.

Species
These four species belong to the genus Muda:
 Muda kuroiwae (Matsumura, 1913) c g
 Muda obtusa (Walker, F., 1858) c g
 Muda tua Schouten, Duffels & Zaidi, 2004 c g
 Muda virguncula (Walker, F., 1857) c g
Data sources: i = ITIS, c = Catalogue of Life, g = GBIF, b = Bugguide.net

References

Further reading

 
 
 
 

Chlorocystini
Cicadidae genera